Indium gallium aluminium nitride (InGaAlN, AlInGaN) is a GaN-based compound semiconductor. It is usually prepared by epitaxial growth, such as MOCVD, MBE, PLD, etc. This material is used for specialist opto-electronics applications, often in blue laser diodes and LEDs.

See also 
 Indium aluminium nitride

References 

III-V semiconductors
Indium compounds
Gallium compounds
Aluminium compounds
Nitrides